Smash Champs is a fighting video game developed by Kiloo for Android, iOS and Windows Phone, released in 2014.

Reception
The gameplay was criticised as "a mediocre Fruit Ninja clone", while other reviewers praised the graphics: "Graphics are well drawn up and the animations help add character to your fighters."

References

External links
 
  Smash Champs on Metacritic

2014 video games
Android (operating system) games
IOS games
Fighting games
Video games developed in Denmark
Windows Phone games